Taibi is a surname. Notable people with the surname include:

 Joe Taibi (born 1963), American football player
 Massimo Taibi (born 1970), Italian football goalkeeper
 Rami Bin Said Al Taibi, Saudi Arabian held in extrajudicial detention in the United States Guantanamo Bay detainment camps
 Waniss Taïbi (born 2002), French football midfielder

See also
 Taibbi